XEP-AM is a talk radio station in Ciudad Juárez, Chihuahua, Mexico. Broadcasting on 1300 AM, XEP is known as Radio Mexicana Nuestras Noticias and is owned by Grupo Radiorama.

History

XEP's concession history begins in 1936 with the award of XEP, originally on 1160 kHz, to Esteban Parra. The station was sold to its current concessionaire in the 1980s. For a time in the 2000s and 2010s, it was run by Grupo Radio México.

Despite the similar name of the station and its format, Radio 13 in Juárez was never related to Radio Trece XEDA-AM in Mexico City, which was owned by Radio S.A.

References

Radio stations in Chihuahua
Spanish-language radio stations
Radio stations established in 1936
Mass media in Ciudad Juárez
1936 establishments in Mexico
Grupo Radio Centro